Musäus is a German surname derived from the Greek Musaeus.

People named Musäus include:
Hans Musäus (1910–1981), actor
Johann Daniel Heinrich Musäus (1749–1821), jurist
Johann Karl August Musäus (1735–1787), short story writer
Johannes Musaeus (1613–1681), theologian
Peter Musaeus (1620–1674), theologian
Simon Musaeus (1521/1529–1576/1582), theologian

German-language surnames